This is an overview of the discography of The End Records and affiliated labels.

The End Records Discography

2014
The Dandy Warhols 'Thirteen Tales From Urban Bohemia Live At The Wonder' (March 25, 2014)
Cage The Gods 'Badlands' (March 25, 2014)
Neil Davidge 'Slo Light' (February 25, 2014)
Nina Persson 'Animal Heart' (February 11, 2014)

2013
Wanz 'The Christmas Song' (December 3, 2013)
The Mission 'Swan Song' (December 3, 2013)
Cage The Gods 'Favourite Sin' (November 25, 2013)
Dead Letter Circus 'The Catalyst Fire' (October 29, 2013)
Arthur Channel 'Arthur Channel' (October 15, 2013)
The Red Paintings 'The Revolution Is Never Coming' (October 1, 2013) 
Okta Logue 'Tales of Transit City' (October 1, 2013)
American Sharks 'American Sharks' (September 17, 2013)
The Mission 'Sometimes The Brightest Light Comes From The Darkest Place' (September 17, 2013)
Sponge 'Stop The Bleeding' (September 17, 2013) 
Crossfaith 'Apocalyze' (September 3, 2013) 
Eklipse 'Electric Air' (September 3, 2013) 
Hey! Hello! 'S/T' (July 23, 2013) 
The Candles 'La Candelaria' (July 9, 2013) 
Mekon 'Piece of Work' (July 9, 2013) 
Spirits of the Dead 'Rumours of a Presence' (June 25, 2013) 
Eklipse 'A Night In Strings' (June 25, 2013) 
Scott Lucas & The Married Men 'The Cruel Summer EP' (June 25, 2013) 
British Electric Foundation 'Music For Quality & Distinction, Volume 3: Dark' (June 11, 2013) 
The Orb (Feat. Lee Scratch Perry) 'More Tales From The Observatory' (June 11, 2013) 
Anvil 'Hope In Hell' (May 28, 2013) 
Sacred Mother Tongue 'Out Of The Darkness' (April 30, 2013) 
Pushmen 'The Sun Will Rise Soon On The False And The Fair' (April 30, 2013) 
While She Sleeps 'This Is The Six (Digital Deluxe)' (April 23, 2013) 
The Red Paintings 'You're Not One Of Them EP' (April 16, 2013) 
Art Brut 'Top Of The Pops' (April 16, 2013) 
Neil Davidge and Kazuma Jinnouchi 'Halo 4 OST, Volume II' (April 9, 2013)
LostAlone 'I'm A UFO In This City' (April 2, 2013) 
Petula Clark 'Lost In You' (April 2, 2013) 
Lordi 'To Beast Or Not To Beast' (March 19, 2013) 
Reverend And The Makers '@Reverend Makers' (March 5, 2013) 
Hatchet 'Dawn Of The End' (March 5, 2013) 
Krokus 'Dirty Dynamite' (March 5, 2013) 
Godflesh 'Hymns: Special Edition' (February 19, 2013) 
Fatboy Slim 'Big Beach Boutique 5' (February 19, 2013) 
Funeral For A Friend 'Conduit' (February 5, 2013) 
Andy Winter 'Incomprehensible' (January 22, 2013)
Helloween 'Straight Out Of Hell' (January 22, 2013)

2012
Halo 4 'OST Remixes' (December 4, 2012) 
Rhythms Del Mundo 'Africa' (November 20, 2012) 
Crossfaith 'Zion EP' (November 13, 2012) 
HIM 'XX Two Decades Of Love Metal' (November 6, 2012) 
FEAR 'The FEAR Record' (November 6, 2012) 
While She Sleeps 'This Is The Six' (November 6, 2012) 
Neil Davidge 'HALO 4 Original Soundtrack' (October 23, 2012) 
My Jerusalem 'Preachers' (October 9, 2012) 
AxeWound 'Vultures' (October 2, 2012) 
James Iha 'Look To The Sky' (September 18, 2012) 
Bad Powers 'S/T' (September 18, 2012) 
Paradise Lost 'Evolve: Live (Reissue)' (August 28, 2012) 
Paradise Lost 'Draconian Times: Legacy Edition' (August 28, 2012) 
Paradise Lost 'Reflection: Best Of (1998 Reissue)' (August 28, 2012) 
Paradise Lost 'Icon (1993 Reissue)' (August 28, 2012) 
Paradise Lost 'Shades of God (Reissue)' (August 28, 2012) 
InMe 'Overgrown Eden (Reissue + Bonus Tracks)' (August 28, 2012) 
The Orb (Feat. Lee Scratch Perry) 'The Observer In The Star House' (August 28, 2012) 
Cosmo Jarvis 'Think Bigger' (July 17, 2012) 
Cradle of Filth 'Dusk And Her Embrace (Reissue)' (July 3, 2012) 
Cradle of Filth 'Cruelty And The Beast' (July 3, 2012) 
Cradle of Filth 'From The Cradle To Enslave (1999)' (July 3, 2012) 
Cradle of Filth 'PanDaemonAeon (Reissue)' (July 3, 2012) 
Cradle of Filth 'Midian (2000 Reissue)' (July 3, 2012) 
Cradle of Filth 'Lovecraft & Witch Hearts (2002 Reissue)' (July 3, 2012) 
Cradle of Filth 'Vempire Or Dark Faerytales' (July 3, 2012) 
Belligerence 'Now Here's Your Secret' (June 19, 2012) 
Chantal Claret 'The One, The Only...' (June 19, 2012) 
1776 'S/T' (June 5, 2012) 
Scott Lucas & The Married Men 'Blood Half Moon' (June 5, 2012) 
Anvil 'Plugged In Permanent (Reissue)' (May 8, 2012) 
Anvil 'Speed Of Sound (Reissue)' (May 8, 2012) 
Anvil 'Absolutely No Alternative (Reissue)' (May 8, 2012) 
Anvil 'Plenty Of Power (Reissue)' (May 8, 2012) 
Hung 'S/T' (May 8, 2012) 
Chantal Claret - The Pleasure Seeker (May 8, 2012) 
Anathema 'Weather Systems' (April 24, 2012) 
Bereft 'Leichenhaus' (April 24, 2012) 
The Dandy Warhols 'This Machine' (April 24, 2012) 
Opeth 'Lamentations (Special Edition)' (April 10, 2012) 
Opeth 'Deliverance (Reissue)' (April 10, 2012) 
Opeth 'Damnation (Reissue)' (April 10, 2012) 
Opeth 'Blackwater Park (Legacy Edition)' (April 10, 2012) 
Sleepy Sun 'Spine Hits' (April 10, 2012) 
Dir En Grey 'Uroboros' (April 10, 2012) 
Freshkills 'Raise Up The Sheets' (March 13, 2012) 
Amoral 'Beneath' (February 14, 2012) 
Anvil 'Worth The Weight (Reissue)' (February 14, 2012) 
Anvil 'Strength Of Steel (Reissue)' (February 14, 2012) 
Anvil 'Pound For Pound (Reissue)' (February 14, 2012) 
One Model Nation 'Total Werks Vol. 1' (January 31, 2012)

2011
Audio Bullys 'Higher Than The Eiffel' (January 18, 2011) 
Does It Offend You, Yeah? 'Don't Say We Didn't Warn You' (March 15, 2011) 
Goes Cube 'In Tides And Drifts' (March 29, 2011) 
Braveyoung 'We Are Lonely Animals' (March 29, 2011) 
Too Late The Hero 'Statement Of Purpose' (April 12, 2011) 
Mindless Self Indulgence 'Tighter' (May 10, 2011) 
Stillwell 'Dirtbag' (May 10, 2011) 
November's Doom 'Aphotic' (May 10, 2011) 
Anvil 'Juggernaut Of Justice' (May 10, 2011) 
Tarja 'Underneath' (May 24, 2011) 
The Prodigy 'World's On Fire (Live)' (May 24, 2011) 
Brendan Perry 'Ark' (May 24, 2011) 
Art Brut 'Brilliant! Tragic!' (May 24, 2011) 
Anathema 'We're Here Because We're Here' (June 7, 2011) 
James Maddock 'Wake Up And Dream' (June 21, 2011) 
Guano Apes 'Bel Air' (June 21, 2011) 
Dir En Grey 'Different Sense' (June 22, 2011) 
Spirits Of The Dead 'The Great God Plan' (July 5, 2011) 
Dir En Grey 'Dum Spiro Spero' (August 2, 2011) 
The Humans 'Sugar Rush' (September 27, 2011) 
Anvil 'Monument Of Metal' (September 27, 2011) 
Hull 'Beyond The Lightless Sky' (October 11, 2011) 
FEAR 'Have Yourself A Merry Little Christmas' (November 22, 2011)

2010
 8 Kekal (December 15, 2010)

2009
 Another Day Has Passed Goes Cube (May 12, 2009)

2008
 Uroboros Dir en grey (November 11, 2008)

2007
 The Novella Reservoir Novembers Doom (February 20, 2007)
 The Arockalypse Lordi (March 20, 2007)
 Requiem - Mezzo Forte Virgin Black (April 3, 2007)
 The Great Filter Tub Ring (May 1, 2007)
 In Glorious Times Sleepytime Gorilla Museum (May 29, 2007)
 Hangman's Hymn Sigh (June 12, 2007)

2006
 The Acoustic Verse Green Carnation (January 24, 2006)
 Murder Nature Head Control System (April 4, 2006)
 Home The Gathering (April 18, 2006)
 Starless Aeon Dissection (April 30, 2006)
 Reinkaos Dissection (May 16, 2006)
 In the Wake of Separation (reissue) Thine Eyes Bleed (May 30, 2006) 
 The Dark Psyche V/A (June 6, 2006)
 The Somberlain Dissection (June 27, 2006)
 Storm of the Light's Bane Dissection (June 27, 2006)
 Katorz Voivod (July 25, 2006)
 Ashes Against the Grain Agalloch (August 8, 2006)
 Metridium Fields Giant Squid (August 22, 2006)
 In a Flesh Aquarium Unexpect (August 22, 2006)
 Grand Opening and Closing! (reissue) Sleepytime Gorilla Museum (September 5, 2006)
 Palace of Mirrors Estradasphere (September 19, 2006) - TE077-2
 There Be Squabbles Ahead Stolen Babies (October 3, 2006) - TE078

2005
 Sardonic Wrath Darkthrone (January, 2005)
 The Sense Apparatus Frantic Bleep (February, 2005)
 Fading Away into the Grave of Nothingness Oathean (February, 2005)
 The Pale Haunt Departure Novembers Doom (March, 2005)
 The Continuum Hypothesis Epoch of Unlight (March, 2005)
 The Quiet Offspring Green Carnation (March, 2005)
 Suspended Animation Dreams Subterranean Masquerade (June, 2005)
 In the Wake of Separation Thine Eyes Bleed (June, 2005)
 Shades of Light Through Black and White Andy Winter (May, 2005)
 Blood Inside Ulver (July, 2005)
 Planetary Confinement Antimatter (July, 2005)
 A Sound Relief DVD The Gathering (October, 2005)

2004
 Temporary Psychotic State Subterranean Masquerade (April, 2004)
 The Imaginary Direction of Time Winds (April, 2004)
 Lost in Reverie Peccatum (May, 2004)
 Like Sheep Led to Slaughter Crisis (May, 2004)
 The Delores Lesion Lilitu (September, 2004)
 Acceleration Age Of Silence (September, 2004)
 To Welcome the Fade (w/ Bonus CD) Novembers Doom (October, 2004)

2003
 Alive Again Nightingale (January, 2003)
 Lyckantropen Themes Ulver (January, 2003)
 Iter. Viator Star of Ash (January, 2003)
 Deadlands Madder Mortem (February, 2003)
 Hate Them Darkthrone (April, 2003)
 Souvenirs The Gathering (May, 2003)
 Below the Lights Enslaved (May, 2003)
 Elegant.. and Dying Virgin Black (June, 2003)
 Lights Out Antimatter (June, 2003)
 Live At the Caledonian Hall In The Woods... (September, 2003)
 PHASES: The Dark Side of Music V/A (October, 2003)

2002
 The Immortality Murder Scholomance (January, 2002)
 Sombre Romantic Virgin Black (February, 2002)
 Light of Day, Day of Darkness Green Carnation (January, 2002)
 Reflections of the I Winds (April, 2002)
 The Sham Mirrors Arcturus (April, 2002)
 At the End of Infinity (Echoes & Thoughts Of Wonder) V/A (April, 2002)
 The Mantle Agalloch (August, 2002)
 Saviour Antimatter (September, 2002)

2001
 Caught in the Unlight! Epoch of Unlight (May, 2001)
 Lunar Poetry Nokturnal Mortum (June, 2001)
 Of Stone, Wind and Pillor Agalloch (August, 2001)
 Winds Blow Higher Sleepless (November, 2001)

2000
 Apollo Ends Sculptured (January, 2000)
 Upon the Shores of Inner Seas Mental Home (April, 2000)
 Nechrist Nokturnal Mortum (July, 2000)
 Deceitful Melody Odes Of Ecstasy (November, 2000)
 Anasazi Love History (November, 2000)

1999
 To the Gates of Blasphemous Fire Nokturnal Mortum (March, 1999)
 Pale Folklore Agalloch (June, 1999)
 The Key to the Gates of Apocalypse Mistigo Varggoth Darkestra (June, 1999)
 White: Nightmares in the End V/A (September, 1999)

1998
 Vale Mental Home (January, 1998)
 ...Until the End of Time V/A (February, 1998)
 Goat Horns Nokturnal Mortum (March, 1998) 
 The Spear of the Lily Is Aureoled Sculptured (March, 1998)
 Embossed Dream in Four Acts Odes Of Ecstasy (June, 1998)
 Black Art Mental Home (August, 1998)
 A Treatise on Love Scholomance (October, 1998)
 What Will Be Has Been Epoch of Unlight (October, 1998)

See also
 The End Records
The End Records artists

References
The End Records (Official Website)

The End Records
Heavy metal discographies